Doris Twitchell Allen (1901–2002) was a noted psychologist and the founder of Children's International Summer Villages (now CISV International). She specialized in development and psychodrama.

Education
After receiving degrees in Chemistry (AB in 1923) and Biology (MA in 1926) at the University of Maine, where she was a member of the national honorary society Phi Kappa Phi, she earned a PhD in Psychology in 1930 at the University of Michigan, and completed her post-graduate study at the Psychological Institute, University of Berlin, in 1932.

Career
Her career as a psychologist began as Director of the Field Laboratory at the Child Education Foundation, now known as CISV in New York City (1932–1935).

From 1962 until her retirement, she was Professor of Psychology at the University of Cincinnati and Professor of Psychology (Psychodrama) at the University of Maine.

She developed several valued tools in the fields of psychology and education. Among them the Social Learning in the Schools Through Psychodrama project  and the Twitchell-Allen Three-dimensional Personality Test for use in CISV research and clinical practice to portray personality dynamics, irrespective of age or culture.

In addition to founding CISV in 1951, Doris Allen served as International President (1951–1956), Trustee (1956–1965), Research Chairman (1951–1967), and Honorary Counsellor (1965–2002), and simultaneously served as President (1956–1965), Research Chair / Co-Chair (1956–1969) and Life Trustee (1970–2002) of CISV USA. From its inception in 1988, Doris Allen had also served as Trustee / Honorary Trustee of the CISV International Peace Fund Trust.

Awards and legacy
In 1979, Doris was also nominated for the Nobel Peace Prize for her work with CISV.

The Doris Twitchell Allen Village (DTAV) student accommodation blocks at the University of Maine were named after her.

Personal life
She was married to Erastus S. Allen, a lawyer for Procter & Gamble.

References

See also
2001 article Camp Kids Were Given Global Mission in Cincinnati Post

Psychodramatists
1901 births
2002 deaths
American centenarians
Child psychologists
University of Maine alumni
University of Michigan College of Literature, Science, and the Arts alumni
People from Old Town, Maine
Women centenarians